This page lists the World Best Year Performance in the year 2004 in both the men's and the women's hammer throw. The main event during this season were the Olympic Games in Athens, Greece, where the final of the men's competition was held on Sunday August 22, 2004. The women had their second ever Olympic final five days later, on August 25, 2004 in the Olympic Stadium.

Men

Records

2004 World Year Ranking

Women

Records

2004 World Year Ranking

References
IAAF
tilastopaja
apulanta
apulanta
hammerthrow.wz

2004
Hammer Throw Year Ranking, 2004